Rayadurga is a Town in Anantapur District in the Indian state of Andhra Pradesh. It is governed by a municipal council. Rayadurga is known for its production of Textile goods and textile manufacturing industry. Rayadurga is now slowly developing with proper transportation, modern amenities. Rayadurgam is well connected with other cities in Andhra Pradesh and Karnataka through well infrastructure of NH 544DD Highway. The nearest airport is Ballari Airport in Karnataka followed by Kurnool, Puttaparthi and Bengaluru . Rayadurga also has a train station with major stations nearby such as Ballari, Guntakal, Gooty & Anantapur.

Demographics 

The total population constitute,  males,  females and
 children, in the age group of 0–6 years. The average literacy rate stands at 69.60% with  literates, significantly lower than the national average of 73.00%..Telugu is the official language in Rayadurga. Kannada and Urdu are also widely spoken here.

Governance

Civic administration 
Rayadurgam municipality is the civic body of the town. It was constituted on 1 October 1963.

Education
The primary and secondary school education is imparted by government, aided and private schools, under the School Education Department of the state. The medium of instruction followed by different schools are English, Telugu and Urdu.

Transport
Rayadurgam Junction railway station falls under the jurisdiction of Hubli railway division of South Western Railway Zone.

References 

Cities and towns in Anantapur district
Mandal headquarters in Anantapur district